The 2017 Atlantic 10 men's soccer tournament, was the 20th edition of the Atlantic 10 Men's Soccer Tournament. It determined the Atlantic 10 Conference's automatic berth into the 2017 NCAA Division I Men's Soccer Championship.

UMass won their third ever A-10 title, and their first in 10 years, defeating VCU 3-1 in the final. VCU reached the championship for a third-consecutive season.

The tournament was hosted by the University of Dayton and all matches from the semifinals onward will be contested at Baujan Field.

Seeds
The top eight teams based on conference regular season record will participate in the tournament.

Bracket

Results

Quarterfinals

Semifinals

Final

Statistics

Top goalscorers

Awards

All-Tournament team 

The Atlantic-10 All-Tournament team was announced following the championship game. Matthew Mooney of UMass won the MVP award.

See also 
2017 Atlantic 10 Conference men's soccer season
2017 Atlantic 10 Conference Women's Soccer Tournament

References 
 

Atlantic 10 Men's Soccer Tournament
Atlantic 10 Men's Soccer Tournament
Atlantic 10 Men's Soccer Tournament